George William Hutson (22 December 1889 – 14 September 1914) was a British athlete who competed mainly in long-distance running events. He was born in Lewes, East Sussex.

He competed for Great Britain in the 1912 Summer Olympics held in Stockholm, Sweden in the 5000 metres where he won the bronze medal.  He also joined team mates Joe Cottrill and Cyril Porter to win his second bronze of the games in the 3000 metre team race.

Hutson was killed in action, aged 24, during World War I, serving as a serjeant with the Royal Sussex Regiment during the Battle of the Marne. His remains were not recovered and his name is recorded on the La Ferte-sous-Jouarre Memorial.

See also
 List of Olympians killed in World War I

References

1889 births
1914 deaths
English male long-distance runners
People from Lewes
Royal Sussex Regiment soldiers
British military personnel killed in World War I
Olympic bronze medallists for Great Britain
Athletes (track and field) at the 1912 Summer Olympics
Olympic athletes of Great Britain
Medalists at the 1912 Summer Olympics
Olympic bronze medalists in athletics (track and field)
British Army personnel of World War I
Military personnel from Sussex